Daniel Mbuizeo  is a South African footballer, who plays for Thailand Premier League club side Samut Songkhram FC.

References

1983 births
Living people
South African soccer players
Expatriate footballers in Thailand
Expatriate footballers in Bulgaria
Association football forwards
PFC Pirin Blagoevgrad players
Daniel Mbuizeo